A biohazard, or biological hazard, is a biological substance that poses a threat to the health of living organisms.

Biohazard may also refer to:

 Biohazard (band), an American band
 Biohazard (1988 demo tape)
 Biohazard (album), 1990
 Biohazard (book), a 1999 non-fiction book by Ken Alibek
 Biohazard (film), a 1985 science-fiction horror film
 BioHazard, a combat robot 
 Resident Evil, known in Japan as Biohazard, a Japanese horror media franchise 
Resident Evil 7: Biohazard, a 2017 video game

See also
Bio-Hazard Battle, a 1992 video game
Biohazzard Records, a German independent record label